Peter John Flannery is an Australian politician currently serving as the Mayor of the Moreton Bay Region, Australia's third most-populous local government area. Flannery was elected mayor in 2020, having served as Councillor for Division 2 from 2012 to 2020. He also served as a Caboolture Shire Councillor from 2004 to 2008.

References

Mayors of places in Queensland
Living people
Year of birth missing (living people)